He Has Nothing But Kung Fu aka. Kung Fu's Deadly Duo is a 1977 Hong Kong martial arts film directed by Lau Kar-wing, starring Gordon Liu and Wong Yue. It was Lau Kar-wing's first film as a director.

Plot

Yung Wang Yu stars as Sha Shan, a crafty con-artist who uses his wiles to trick money out of the unsuspecting public while also avoiding those he enrages. One particular escapade sees him make a fool out of a local gang member who also loses a considerable amount of money in the process. Unfortunately this sets into motion a series of events which sees the shamed victim sending his vicious gang out to exact revenge and the wily young trickster with no option but to run away. During these events, he also meets a dazed amnesiac (Liu Chia Hui) he proves himself to be a formidable fighter shortly afterwards and helps his new friend out in a few close escapes from the antagonists. The mystery man - who is actually Ka Yuen, the missing son of a wealthy Admiral - uses his exceptional fighting prowess for good, defeating the oppressive enemies while also dragging the hapless Sha Shan along on a mission to rob the evil to give to the poor.

Cast
 Gordon Liu
 Yung Wang Yu
 Chiang Tao
 Wilson Tong
 Lau Kar-wing
 Karl Maka
 Mars
 Lam Ching Ying
 Austin Wai
 Chung Fat
 Mang Hoi
 King Lee
 Hsiao Hou
 Peter Chan
 Hoi Sang Lee
 Baan Yun-Sang

References

External links
 
 
He Has Nothing But Kung Fu at Hong Kong Cinemagic
 Review by Andrew Saroch at fareastfilms.com
 Review by Justin Decloux at filmtrap.com

Kung fu films
Hong Kong martial arts films
1977 films
1977 action films
1970s Hong Kong films